Mohr may refer to:

Places
 Mohr, Fars, a city in Iran
 Mohr County, an administrative subdivision of Iran
 Mohr Rural District, an administrative subdivision of Iran

Science and math
 Mohr's circle, two-dimensional graphical representation of the state of stress at a point
 Mohr–Coulomb theory, mathematical model describing the response of brittle materials
 Mohr–Mascheroni theorem, used in mathematics and geometry
 Mohr pipette, a laboratory volumetric instrument
 Mohr's salt, common name of Ammonium iron(II) sulfate

Other
 Mohr (surname), a German-language surname (also listing people with that surname)
 Michigan Organization for Human Rights, a defunct Michigan LGBT and human rights advocacy organization
 Saint Maurice (died 287), French pronunciation transliterated into German "Moritz" or short, "Mohr"
 Turbah, a small clay tablet used by Shi'a Muslims during daily prayers

See also
 Mohur (alternate spelling), a gold coin of South Asia
 Moor (disambiguation)
 Moore (disambiguation)
 More (disambiguation)
 More (surname)
 Moore